Pinchi Lake is a ghost town located in the Omineca Country region of British Columbia, Canada. The town is situated north of Pinchi Lake, northwest of Fort St. James. The town was originally a settlement for a mercury mine.

References

Ghost towns in British Columbia
Omineca Country